Jackson Bridge is a small village in the civil parish of Holme Valley in the Metropolitan Borough of Kirklees in West Yorkshire, England and within the postal district of Holmfirth. 
It is situated next to the A616, Huddersfield to Penistone, road.

Description
Jackson Bridge is the location for the pub which Clegg's house  is situated behind in the BBC's long-running comedy Last of the Summer Wine. It is located close to the edge of the Peak District National Park.

Dobroyd Mills, which dominated the village, was once a major contributor to the West Yorkshire textile industry, producing fine worsted cloth for export. At the end of their use the mill buildings housed a fine yarn spinners, John Woodheads (Dobroyd Mills) Ltd, plus other small businesses such as computer services and facilities, engineering, sheet metal works and motor vehicle services. After a period of dereliction, the complex was demolished in 2020.

Most of the surrounding countryside is given over to agriculture, significantly milk cattle and sheep.

The village is known as 'Jigby' by locals.

References

External links
Ordnance Survey Map

Villages in West Yorkshire
Geography of Holmfirth
Peak District
Towns and villages of the Peak District
Holme Valley